The 2013–14 Western Kentucky Hilltoppers men's basketball team represented Western Kentucky University during the 2013–14 NCAA Division I men's basketball season. The Hilltoppers were led by head coach Ray Harper in his second full year after coaching the final 19 games in 2011–12. They played their home games at E. A. Diddle Arena and were members of the Sun Belt Conference. They finished the season 20–12, 12–6 in Sun Belt play to finish in second place. They lost in the semifinals of the Sun Belt Conference tournament where they lost to Louisiana–Lafayette. Despite having 21 wins, they did not play in a postseason tournament.

This was their last season as a member of the Sun Belt as they will move to Conference USA in July, 2014.

Roster

Schedule

|-
!colspan=9 style="background:#F5002F; color:#FFFFFF;"| Exhibition
 
|-
!colspan=9 style="background:#F5002F; color:#FFFFFF;"| Regular season
 
 
 
 
 
 
 

 

|-
!colspan=9 style="background:#F5002F; color:#FFFFFF;"| Sun Belt Tournament

References

Western Kentucky Hilltoppers basketball seasons
WKU